Charles Eryl Wynn-Williams (5 March 1903 – 30 August 1979), was a Welsh physicist, noted for his research on electronic instrumentation for use in nuclear physics. His work on the scale-of-two counter contributed to the development of the modern computer.

Early life and studies
Wynn-Williams was born at 'Glasfryn' in Swansea, Glamorganshire, Wales, on 5 March 1903. He was the eldest child of William Williams (1863–1945), a physics teacher and later divisional inspector of schools for north and mid-Wales, and Mary Ellen Wynn (1907–1935), known as Nell, daughter of Robert Wynn, a shopkeeper in Llanrwst.  His education was at Grove Park School in Wrexham, and, from 1920, at Bangor University, where he graduated in 1923. He stayed at this university to undertake research work on electrical instrumentation, and gained the degree of MSc from the University of Wales in 1924.  He was known as C. E. Wynn-Williams from his time at University onwards.

Wynn-Williams was Liberal in politics and was a Welsh-speaker. On 12 August 1943 he married in London Annie Eiluned James (b. 1907/8), a school-teacher, with whom he had two sons.

Prewar research
In October 1925 he entered Trinity College, Cambridge, having been awarded a University of Wales open fellowship. Initially he continued research into short electric waves at the Cavendish Laboratory under the supervision of Sir Ernest Rutherford, and was awarded the degree of PhD for this work in 1929.

Wynn-Williams' most significant work in this period, however, was in the development of electronic instrumentation for use in radioactivity and nuclear physics. Like many scientists at that time he was a wireless enthusiast.

In 1926 he employed his electronics skills to construct an amplifier using thermionic valves (vacuum tubes) for very small electrical currents. It was realized that such devices could be used in the detection and counting of Alpha particles in the nuclear disintegration experiments then being undertaken by Rutherford, who encouraged him to devote his attention to the construction of a reliable valve amplifier and methods of registering and counting particles.

There followed a series of brilliant contributions to the armamentarium of nuclear physics. In 1929–30, with H. M. Cave and F. A. B. Ward he designed and constructed a binary prescaler for an electro-mechanical counter using thyratrons. By 1931 a valve amplifier and thyratron-based automatic counting system were in regular use in the Cavendish Laboratory. Wynn-Williams' amplifier played an important part in James Chadwick's discovery of the neutron in 1932, and in numerous other experiments.

In 1932 Wynn-Williams published details of his thyratron-based scale-of-two counter, which allowed particles to be counted at much higher rates than previously. His devices became crucial unifying elements in the hardware of the emergent discipline of nuclear physics, as they opened up new avenues of research. They were widely copied in laboratories in Europe and the United States of America, often with advice from Wynn-Williams.

In 1935 Wynn-Williams was appointed assistant lecturer in physics at Imperial College, London. Continuing his work on electronic instrumentation he contributed to the development of nuclear physics at Imperial under G. P. Thomson.

Wartime
On the eve of the Second World War, Wynn-Williams, like many of his scientific contemporaries, was recruited to work on the developing discipline of radio detection and ranging (RADAR) at the Telecommunications Research Establishment, later the Royal Radar Establishment, Malvern.

On 1 February 1942, the Allied success in breaking Nazi German naval Enigma messages suffered a serious setback.  This was due to the adoption, for the North Atlantic U-boat traffic, of an Enigma machine with an additional rotor — the four-wheel Enigma. This increased the time required of the Turing-designed Bombe machines by a factor of 26. Higher speed bombes were therefore needed and Wynn-Williams was called in to contribute to one of the streams of development of high-speed Bombes.

The Post Office team developed a Bombe attachment for a standard three-wheel Bombe containing high speed wheels and an electronic sensing unit. It was attached to the Bombe by a very thick cable and was dubbed the Cobra Bombe.  Twelve were made at the Mawdsley engineering factory in Dursley, Gloucestershire, but turned out to be unreliable, so the other stream of development at the British Tabulating Machine Company at Letchworth was preferred. Both machines were subsequently overshadowed by the great success of the US Navy Bombes.

Towards the end of 1942 the previously experimental non-Morse transmissions from teleprinter cipher machines were being received in greater numbers by the British Signals Intelligence collection sites. The one using the Lorenz SZ 40/42, code-named Tunny at the Government Code & Cypher School at Bletchley Park, was used for high-level traffic between German High Command and field commanders. A young chemistry graduate, Bill Tutte worked out how it could in theory be broken. He took the idea to his boss, the mathematician Max Newman, who realised that the only feasible way to apply the method, was by automating it.

Knowing of Wynn-Williams' work on electronic counters at Cambridge, he called for his help. He worked with a team from the Post Office Research Station at Dollis Hill, which later included Tommy Flowers. They constructed a machine to do this that was dubbed Heath Robinson after the cartoonist who designed fantastical machines. The series of Robinson machines were forerunners of the ten Colossus machines, the world's first programmable digital electronic computers.

Postwar
Returning to Imperial College after the war, Wynn-Williams devoted himself largely to the development of practical undergraduate teaching, where he was an accomplished and much liked instructor. He became lecturer and ultimately reader in physics at Imperial. In 1957 he received the Physical Society's Duddell medal in recognition of his work on the scale-of-two counter.

Like most who worked at Bletchley Park, Wynn-Williams did not receive official recognition for his wartime work, and he always observed the oath of secrecy surrounding it, although he retained an interest in codes and puzzles throughout his life. Professor R. V. Jones, UK Government Scientific Intelligence advisor in the second World War, wrote in Nature in 1981: 

On his retirement in 1970 Wynn-Williams and his wife moved to Dôl-y-Bont, near Borth, in Cardiganshire.

References

Bibliography
 
 
 
 
 
 
 
 
 
 
 
 
 
 
 
 
 
 

British physicists
Bletchley Park people
Welsh physicists
People from Swansea
People from Ceredigion
Academics of Imperial College London
Alumni of Bangor University
1903 births
1979 deaths
People educated at Grove Park School, Wrexham
20th-century Welsh scientists
20th-century British physicists